Mansurov is a surname. Notable people with the surname include:

Bahram Mansurov (1911–1985), Azerbaijani Soviet musician
Dilshod Mansurov (born 1983), Uzbekistani sport wrestler
Eldar Mansurov (born 1952), Azerbaijani musician, composer and songwriter
Farid Mansurov (born 1982), Azerbaijani sport wrestler
Fuat Mansurov (1928–2010), Russian Soviet conductor

Meaning And background 
Mansurov has an unknown meaning.

While there are a few cases of Mansurov being a given name, Mansurov has been the given name to 53 people in four countries thus far. It is common as a surname, having found the surname Mansurov at least 1067 times in at least 15 countries.

Mansurov may have some Russian origins seeing as the name is commonly given to Russians.

References